was a Japanese poet, activist, and survivor of the atomic bombing of Hiroshima.

Biography
He was born Mitsuyoshi Tōge in Osaka as the youngest son of Ki'ichi Tōge, a successful manufacturer of bricks. From the start Tōge was a sickly child, suffering from asthma and periodic vomiting. He graduated from Hiroshima Prefecture's school of commerce in 1935, and started working for the Hiroshima Gas Company. In 1938 Tōge was diagnosed, wrongly, with tuberculosis. Believing himself to have only a few years to live, he spent most of his time as an invalid. In 1948 Tōge learned that the diagnosis was wrong. He had bronchiectasis, an enlargement of the bronchial tube. 

He started composing poems in the second year of middle school. Early influences included Tolstoy, Heine, Tōson Shimazaki, and Haruo Sato. In 1938 he read his first piece of proletarian literature. In December 1942, he was baptized into the Catholic Church. By 1945 he composed three thousand tanka and even more haiku. They were mostly lyric poems. Twenty-four-year-old Tōge was in Hiroshima when the atomic bomb was dropped on the city. By 1951 he was writing poetry startlingly different from his earlier efforts. In 1949 Toge joined the Japanese Communist Party. His first collection of the atomic bomb works, Genbaku Shishu ("Poems of the Atomic Bomb") was published in 1951. 

Tōge died at the age of 36 in the operating room in Hiroshima. His first-hand experience with the atomic bomb, his passion for peace and his realistic insight into the event made him the leading poet in Hiroshima.

Genbaku Shishu (Poems of the Atomic Bomb)

See also
Atomic Bomb Literature

References

Further reading
Robert Jungk, Children of the Ashes, Eng. ed. 1961

External links
Unpublished writings by Sankichi Toge, well-known A-bomb poet, are discovered 
Hiroshima Piano (2020 Film) (Official Website)

Hibakusha
1917 births
1953 deaths
20th-century Japanese poets